Ilaria Cusinato (born 5 October 1999) is an Italian swimmer. She competed at the 2020 Summer Olympics, in 200 m individual medley and 400 m individual medley.

She competed in the women's 400 metre individual medley event at the 2018 European Aquatics Championships, winning the silver medal. Cusinato is an athlete of the Gruppo Sportivo Fiamme Oro.

At the 2022 European Aquatics Championships, Cusinato won the bronze medal in the 200 metre butterfly with a time of 2:07.77.

References

External links
 

1999 births
Living people
Italian female swimmers
People from Cittadella
Italian female medley swimmers
Swimmers at the 2015 European Games
European Aquatics Championships medalists in swimming
European Championships (multi-sport event) silver medalists
European Games medalists in swimming
European Games silver medalists for Italy
Swimmers of Fiamme Oro
Swimmers at the 2020 Summer Olympics
Olympic swimmers of Italy
Universiade medalists in swimming
Medalists at the 2019 Summer Universiade
Sportspeople from the Province of Padua
21st-century Italian women
Universiade bronze medalists for Italy